Martin Chuzzlewit  is a British television series which first aired on the BBC in 1964. It is based on the novel Martin Chuzzlewit  by Charles Dickens.

No complete recordings of the production are known to exist, and it is presumed lost.

Main cast
 Gary Raymond as Martin Chuzzlewit (13 episodes)
 Richard Pearson as Pecksniff (13 episodes)
 Barry Jones as Martin Chuzzlewit the Elder (12 episodes)
 John Quentin as  Tom Pinch (12 episodes)
 Alex Scott as Jonas Chuzzlewit (12 episodes)
 Tom Watson as Mark Tapley (12 episodes)
 Anna Middleton as Mercy (11 episodes)
 Rosalind Knight as Charity (10 episodes)
 Ilona Rodgers as Mary Graham (9 episodes)
 Peter Bayliss as Montague Tigg (8 episodes)
 Jeremy Burnham as John Westlock (8 episodes)
 Angela Baddeley as Mrs. Gamp (7 episodes)
 Harold Scott as Chuffey (7 episodes)
 Fern Warner as  Ruth Pinch ( 6 episodes)
 Carl Bernard as  Antony Chuzzlewit (5 episodes)
 Blake Butler as  Nadgett (5 episodes)
 John Golightly as  Lewsome (5 episodes)
 Barbara Ogilvie as Mrs. Lupin (5 episodes)
 Barbara Cavan as Mrs. Todgers (4 episodes)
 Peter Craze as Bailey (4 episodes) 
 Deborah Millington as  Jane (4 episodes)
 Vernon Dobtcheff as Footman (3 episodes)
 Pearson Dodd as Mr. Moddle (3 episodes)
 Frederick Farley as Employer (3 episodes)
 Kathleen Harrison as  Mrs. Prig (3 episodes)
 Ruth Porcher as  Poor woman (3 episodes)
 Peter Stephens as Mr. Jinkins (3 episodes)

Archive status
All thirteen episodes were shot, edited and broadcast using 405-line black and white videotapes, which were all subsequently wiped for reuse. Telerecordings existed, but they were also junked at a later date, and the serial remains mostly lost. According to Kaleidoscope, a "large chunk" from the end of episode thirteen, sourced from a 16mm film recording, does exist, which includes the end credits with the BBC's spinning globe announcement, "this is BBC1" at the end. This is believed to have come from the serial's repeat broadcast. This clip is not available publicly.

The only publicly available visual reference to the production is a publicity still used for the front cover of a Radio Times magazine, showing Gary Raymond, Barry Jones and Ilona Rodgers in character as Martin Chuzzlewit the younger, Martin Chuzzlewit the elder and Mary Graham respectively.

References

Bibliography
 Michael Pointer. Charles Dickens on the Screen: The Film, Television, and Video Adaptations. Scarecrow Press, 1996.

External links
 

BBC television dramas
1964 British television series debuts
1964 British television series endings
1960s British drama television series
English-language television shows
Television series set in the 19th century
Television shows based on works by Charles Dickens